Bangaru Kutumbam  ( Golden Family) is a 1994 Telugu-language drama film, produced by Kaikala Nageswara Rao under the Ramaa Films banner, presented by Satyanarayana and directed by Dasari Narayana Rao. It stars Akkineni Nageswara Rao and Jayasudha with music composed by Raj–Koti. The film was a box office success and won two Nandi Awards.

Plot
The story revolves around a conscientious joint family, Srinivasa Rao (Akkineni Nageswara Rao) is its paterfamilias and leads a pleasant joyful family life with his ideal companion Savitri (Jayasudha) and 3 sons Hari (Harish), Suryam (Vikram) and Kumar (Raj Kumar). Time being, the 3 sons get married and they too are blessed with kids when disputes erupt which turns into turbulence. Here Srinivasa Rao understands this situation is due to a joint family and decides to separate his children to which Savitri refuses. So, Srinivasa Rao plays a drama and splits his children. Thereafter, the affection among them again flourish. Soon, Savitri learns the truth and asks her husband to get back the children but he disagrees, so, she too leaves the house. At last, she realizes Srinivasa Rao's intention is equitable. Finally, the movie ends on a happy note as all of them live individually with hearts united showing Unity in Diversity.

Cast

 Akkineni Nageswara Rao as Srinivasa Rao
 Jayasudha as Savitri, wife of Srinivasa Rao  
 Harish as Hari 
 Rambha as Pushpa
 Raj Kumar as Kumar 
 Rajeevi as Gautami 
 Vikram as Suryam
 Yamuna as Krishnaveni
 Allu Ramalingaiah as Punyakoti
 Satyanarayana as Dorababu 
 Dasari Narayana Rao as Mudaliyar
 Giri Babu as Pushpa's brother-in-law
 Kanta Rao
 Babu Mohan as Shekhara
 Ananth as Hari's friend
 Sudha as Pushpa's sister 
 Radha Prashanthi as Pushpa's friend
 Disco Shanti as Chiramani
 Y. Vijaya as Taramani

Soundtrack

Music composed by Raj–Koti.  Lyrics were written by Veturi. Music released on Supreme Music Company.

Reception
The Indian Express wrote "The subject of a united ideal family separating and then re-uniting has been tackled often enough, but Dasari still manages to infuse some freshness in his handling of the subject".

Awards

Nandi Awards - 1994
Best Feature Film - Gold - Kaikala Nageswara Rao
Best Actor - Akkineni Nageswara Rao

References

External links

1994 films
Indian romance films
Films directed by Dasari Narayana Rao
Films scored by Raj–Koti
1990s Telugu-language films
1990s romance films